The Dylan Thomas Prize is a leading prize for young writers presented annually.  The prize, named in honour of the Welsh writer and poet Dylan Thomas, brings international prestige and a remuneration of £30,000 (~$46,000). It is open to published writers in the English language under the age of forty. The prize was originally awarded biennially, but became an annual award in 2010. Entries for the prize are submitted by the publisher, editor, or agent; for theatre plays and screenplays, by the producer.

A Dylan Thomas literary prize was first awarded during the 1980s, known as the Dylan Thomas Award, following the campaign to have a plaque in the poet's memory placed in Westminster Abbey.  Surplus income from a fund-raising concert sponsored by the television company HTV were donated to allow a prize of £1000 to be awarded annually.  After several years, the prize was discontinued for lack of finance.  It was revived, in a different form, in 2004, sponsored by Electronic Data Systems, at that time one of Swansea's largest employers.

The Prize honours its shortlist finalists and annual winner for published work in the broad range of literary forms in which Dylan Thomas excelled, including poetry, prose, fictional drama, short story collections, novels, novellas, stage plays and screenplays.  “We want the world to be aware of the Welsh interest in promoting new writing.  Our Prize provides an inspiration for a whole new generation of writers throughout the English-speaking world,” said Peter Stead, Chair of The Dylan Thomas Prize.

Recipients

References

External links
 The Dylan Thomas Prize, official website

Welsh literary awards
Awards established in 2004
Literary awards honouring young writers
2004 establishments in Wales
English-language literary awards
Dylan Thomas